WZZQ (1500 AM) is a radio station licensed to Gaffney, South Carolina.

As WEAC, the station took over the former programming of sister FM WAGI in 2007. WOLT took over Gaffney High School broadcasts. Dennis Fowler, who served as Gaffney Broadcasting station manager, bought WEAC at the time Davidson Media Group bought WAGI.

Unless the listener was in Cherokee County, it was nearly impossible to receive the AM broadcast, due to its low power 1,000 watt daytime only transmitter.  WZZQ transmits from the original WAGI studio on Providence Road in Gaffney and broadcast in the daytime only until August 23, 2009, when the translator W282AX was added at 104.3 to add nighttime programming and a wider signal range.

For the 2009 season, Gaffney High School sports moved from WOLT to WZZQ's FM translator.

WZZQ began broadcasting pre-game coverage of the football games of the Limestone College Saints during their debut season in 2014.  WZZQ also airs broadcasts of "Saints Live!" relating to Limestone sports from Limestone's campus and Fatz Cafe in Gaffney.  The program often features interviews with student athletes from Limestone.

On July 6, 2015 WZZQ changed their format from country to adult hits, branded as "Gaffney's Hot FM".

References

External links

Gaffney Ledger Editorial on the WAGI format change

ZZQ
ZZQ